Hagenow is a German town in the southwest of Mecklenburg-Western Pomerania, in the district of Ludwigslust-Parchim, 30 kilometers south of Schwerin. Its population is approximately 11,300 inhabitants (2013).

Hagenow is part of the Hamburg Metropolitan Region.

Sights and monuments
 Renovated old town, particularly along Lange Straße and Lindenplatz.
 Stadtkirche, built in 1875-1879 in Neo-Gothic style.
 Stadtmuseum (City Museum), located in an eighteenth-century half-timbered house.
 Städtischer Wasserturm Hagenow  (watertower), 28 meters high, erected between 1905-1908 with Neo-Gothic windows. In 1938 the Luftwaffe commissioned the refurbishment of the tower.

Old synagogue
The Alte Synagoge or Hanna-Meinungen-Haus (old synagogue) is a former synagogue in the old town of Hagenow. Hirsch Samuel Meinungen purchased the plot in 1820, with the intention of building a synagogue for the then 80 person strong Jewish community in Hagenow. In 1828 the architectural complex contained a school/parish hall, a cart shed (where carts for funerals were kept), the synagogue with a Mikwe or Mikveh, a bath for the ritual immersion in Judaism. On August 15 of the same year, the solemn consecration of the temple took place.

Between 1839 and 1881, Jewish families from surrounding areas (i.e. Lübtheen and Vellahn) joined the Hagenow synagogue, however due to the absence of a permanent rabbi (in 1907) and a population migration to more affluent cities, the number of members dwindled and with them the funding and sponsorships for the synagogue. The last elected leader of the community, Samuel Meinungen (grandson of Hirsch S. Meinungen) proposed that the use of the prayer house should be changed. Although Meinungen never intended to sell the building, he considered renting it out to the Catholic church, a proposal rejected by the high council.

Due to the Nazi regime Meinungen and his family, including his infant daughter Hanna Meinungen (ca. 18 months), were deported to Auschwitz concentration camp, where Samuel Meinungen died on the 25.11.1937. Although untraceable, it is speculated that his entire family died around this time. During the Kristallnacht (1938) most of the interior was destroyed, however due to its position within the town and the close proximity to adjacent properties, the  building and the Mikwe remained largely intact.
Extensive restoration of the Synagogue started in 2004 and lasted until 2009. Nowadays the building is used as a community hall, a museum and a venue for special events such as exhibitions from local schools.

Government
On the 14.6.2015 Die Linke (The Left party) candidate Thomas Möller replaced SPD (social democrat) Gisela Schwarz as Mayor.

Notable people
Dieter Berg (born 1966), boxer
 (1898–1995), geologist and paleontologist
 (born 1981), actress and singer
 (1852–1929), zoologist and ichthyologist
 (1896–1969), politician (SPD)
 (born 1945), politician (SPD in the GDR, SPD)
 (born 1930), author of radio plays and Low German texts
Maria Kraus-Boelté (1836–1918), German-American educator
 (born 1961), Evangelical Lutheran theologian and bishop of the Evangelical Lutheran Church in Northern Germany
Stefan Nimke (born 1978), Olympic and world champion track cyclist
Lukas Pägelow (born 1994), footballer (LSK Hansa)
Carl Schmidt (1868–1938), coptologist
Kurt Schröder (1888–1962), composer
Michael Timm (born 1962), amateur boxer for East Germany
Charles Nelson (businessman) (1835-1891), distiller

References

External links

Cities and towns in Mecklenburg
Ludwigslust-Parchim
Populated places established in 1754
1754 establishments in the Holy Roman Empire
Grand Duchy of Mecklenburg-Schwerin
Holocaust locations in Germany